The Gottschalk Medal is awarded every year by the Australian Academy of Science to recognize outstanding research by Australian scientists under 40 years of age for research in the medical sciences conducted mainly in Australia.

This medal commemorates the work of the late Dr. Alfred Gottschalk, FAA and has been awarded every year since 1979.

Award winners
Sources:

See also

 List of medicine awards

Notes

External links
  Gottschalk Medal site of the Australian Academy of Science

Medicine awards
Australian science and technology awards
Awards established in 1979
Australian Academy of Science Awards